Washburn University (WU) is a public university in Topeka, Kansas, United States. It offers undergraduate and graduate programs, as well as professional programs in law and business. Washburn has 550 faculty members, who teach more than 6,100 undergraduate students and nearly 800 graduate students. The university's assets include a $158 million endowment.

History
Washburn University was established at Topeka, Kansas, in February 1865 as "Lincoln College", by a charter issued by the State of Kansas and the General Association of Congregational Ministers and Churches of Kansas; the land on which the college stood was donated by abolitionist John Ritchie. The institution was renamed "Washburn College" in 1868, after Ichabod Washburn pledged $25,000 to the school. Washburn was a church deacon, abolitionist, and industrialist who lived in Worcester, Massachusetts.

 Washburn College adopted a variation of the Washbourne arms as its emblem, substituting the school colors for the tinctures of the arms. Since becoming a university, however, Washburn has abandoned use of the family arms. Instead, the university now employs a stylized "W" as the emblem of the institution. The school mascot, "The Ichabod", is still in use.

"The Ichabod" honors the namesake and early benefactor of the institution, Ichabod Washburn. "The Ichabod" existed only in name until 1938, when alumnus (and later prominent graphic artist) Bradbury Thompson (B.A., 1934) created the studious-looking, tailcoat-wearing figure the university uses today. The athletic teams are nicknamed "Ichabods", although women's teams did not use that nickname until the 2013–14 school year.

In 1913, the medical department of Washburn College closed. The Kansas Medical School had become infamous on December 10, 1895, when the public discovered that some of the bodies used for anatomical study had been stolen from local cemeteries. As the news was being printed (eventually across the country), the governor, fearing riots, called out state troops to protect the school. Three of the doctors, including the dean of the school, and a student-janitor from the school were arrested, as was one man who was not a member of the school. Charges against the doctors were discharged, the janitor was convicted but had his conviction reversed on appeal, and the fifth man was convicted but later pardoned.

During World War II, Washburn Municipal University was one of 131 colleges and universities in the nation taking part in the V-12 Navy College Training Program, which offered students a path to a Navy commission.

On June 8, 1966, only a few days after classes were dismissed for the summer, much of the campus was demolished by a tornado, and completely denuded of trees.  Three months before the tornado struck, the Washburn board of trustees had reinsured every building on campus for the maximum amount. A week after the tornado struck, summer classes began at Topeka West High School. By the fall of 1966, Stoffer Hall was repaired and trailers were in place. It took years to reconstruct the campus, with students attending classes in trailers well into the early 1970s.

Formerly a municipal university, the university's primary funding was moved from city property tax to county sales tax sources in 1999, with the school retaining status as a municipal subdivision of the state. Washburn is governed by its own nine-member Board of Regents.

Leadership

Washburn University is governed by a nine-member board of regents. Three, who must be residents of the state of Kansas, are appointed by the governor. Three residents of the City of Topeka, one from each of the state senatorial districts, are appointed by the mayor. One is the mayor or a member of the governing body of the city designated by the mayor. The Shawnee County Commission appoints one member, who must be a resident of Shawnee County but not of the City of Topeka. The Kansas Board of Regents annually selects one of its members to serve on the Washburn Board. Members of the board (with the exception of the Kansas Board of Regents' appointee) serve staggered four-year terms.

Presidents
These persons have served as presidents or interim presidents of Washburn College (1869–1940), Washburn Municipal University of Topeka (1941–1952), and Washburn University (1952–present).

Law school

Formed in 1903, the Washburn School of Law was one of the first in the country to have a legal clinic where students are able to actively practice the legal profession. Today, it is in the minority of law schools to employ a full-time faculty for its law clinic. The Washburn School of Law had the highest pass rate of the Kansas bar examination of any law school in Kansas. The Washburn Law Library houses over 380,000 volumes and is the largest in the state. Notable alumni include Bob Dole, Roy Wilford Riegle, Dennis Moore, Kim Phillips, Bill Kurtis, and Fred Phelps.

Buildings
The main buildings of Washburn University are all dedicated to someone or are an important part of Washburn's history.

Athletics 

The Washburn athletic teams are called the Ichabods. The university is a member of the NCAA Division II ranks, primarily competing in the Mid-America Intercollegiate Athletics Association (MIAA) since the 1989–90 academic year. The Ichabods previously competed in the Central States Intercollegiate Conference (CSIC) of the National Association of Intercollegiate Athletics (NAIA) from 1976–77 to 1988–89; in the Great Plains Athletic Conference (GPAC) from 1972–73 to 1975–76; in the Rocky Mountain Athletic Conference (RMAC) from 1968–69 to 1971–72; in the Central Intercollegiate Athletic Conference (CIC) from 1940–41 to 1967–68 (which they were a member on a previous stint from 1923–24 to 1932–33); as an Independent from 1933–34 to 1939–40; and in the Kansas Collegiate Athletic Conference (KCAC) from 1902–03 to 1922–23.

Washburn competes in 16 intercollegiate varsity sports: Men's sports include baseball, basketball, cross country, football, golf, tennis and track & field (indoor and outdoor); while women's sports include basketball, cross country, soccer, softball, tennis, track & field (indoor and outdoor) and volleyball.

Athletic director 
The current athletics director is Loren Ferré.

Nickname 
The "Ichabods" nickname is named after the university's contributor Ichabod Washburn, who was also the founder of Worcester Polytechnic Institute. Prior to the 2013–14 season, the women's athletic teams were known as the "Lady Blues". On May 24, 2013, President Farley announced that all athletic teams will be known as the Ichabods for the first time in history.

Greek life
Greek Life at Washburn University has existed since 1909. Currently, the four Interfraternity Council and the three Panhellenic Council organizations are housed on or near campus.

Campus attractions 
 Crane Observatory houses an 1898 Warner & Swasey refracting telescope.
 KTWU, a non-commercial, public television station authorized by the Federal Communications Commission, Washington, D.C., and licensed to Washburn University. KTWU, the first public television station in Kansas, commenced telecasting October 21, 1965.
 Mulvane Art Museum opened in 1924. The museum's permanent collection, though international in scope, emphasizes the work of artists of Kansas and the Midwest.
Walking Bods, seven steel sculptures crafted by Barrett DeBusk.

Notable alumni

References

External links

 
 Washburn Athletics website
 

 
Educational institutions established in 1865
Education in Shawnee County, Kansas
Public universities and colleges in Kansas
Buildings and structures in Topeka, Kansas
Tourist attractions in Topeka, Kansas
Education in Topeka, Kansas
1865 establishments in Kansas